Gallia is an 1871 motet for soprano, chorus, orchestra, and organ by Charles Gounod. The text is a setting of Lamentations with alternative French text by Gounod.

It was written for the 1871 International Exhibition in London.

Recordings
Gallia (Lamentation). Cecile Perrin (soprano), Chorus and Orchestra of Paris-Sorbonne, Jacques Grimbert, conductor. Marco Polo DDD8.223892 (1995)

References

Compositions by Charles Gounod
1871 compositions
Motets